Mary Beckett (1926–2013) was an Irish author.

Biography
She was born in Belfast. She attended St. Dominic's High School and then proceeded to St. Mary's Teacher Training College. She married and moved to Dublin where she worked as a teacher. She had five children.

Writing career
In the 1950s, she wrote radio plays for BBC Northern Ireland and had several short stories published.

It was not until she was in her fifties that she began publish again. Her first was a collection of her earlier short stories entitled A Belfast Woman (1980). This was followed by A Literary Woman (1990). She also wrote a novel entitled Give them Stones (1987), and several children's books including Orla was Six, Orla at School, A Family Tree, and Hannah, or the Pink Balloons.

References 

1926 births
2013 deaths
20th-century Irish women writers
20th-century Irish short story writers
Irish women novelists
20th-century Irish novelists
Irish women short story writers
Writers from Belfast
People educated at St Dominic's Grammar School for Girls